The Al Fassiyine Synagogue or Slat Al Fassiyine is a synagogue located in the Mellah of Fes el-Jdid, within the historic medina of Fez, Morocco. The Slat al-Fassiyine Synagogue was one of the few synagogues where the non-Sephardic rituals of the toshavim (indigenous Moroccan Jews) continued up until the 20th century.

History
Slat al-Fassiyin ("Prayer of the Fessis" or "Prayer of the People from Fez") is reputed to be the oldest synagogue of the Mellah of Fez and one of the oldest in continuous use. It is thought to have been built during the Marinid Sultanate (13th-15th centuries). Its current building dates from the 17th century. In 1791–92, Moulay Yazid expelled the Jews from the Mellah and turned Slat al Fassiyine into a prison. However, after a short period, he allowed them to go back.

Decline
The synagogue continued being used actively through the end of the 1950s, when most of the Jewish community left the country for Israel, France, and Montreal (Canada). After Morocco gained its independence from France in 1956, the synagogue fell into disrepair and was eventually was turned into a carpet-making workshop, and later a boxing gymnasium.

Restoration
The synagogue was reinaugurated in February 2013 by the Prime Minister Abdelilah Benkirane, with the funds for the restoration coming from the German government, the Jewish community of Fez, the Foundation for Moroccan Jewish Cultural Heritage, and the Moroccan government.

References

Fez, Morocco
Jews and Judaism in Morocco
Synagogues in Morocco
Judaism in Fez